Luis Alberto Ojeda (born 21 March 1990) is an Argentine football goalkeeper who plays for Sol de América, on loan from Platense.

Career

Ojeda began his playing career with local team Unión de Santa Fe of the Argentine 2nd division in 2008.

In 2009, he was signed by Argentinos Juniors as a reserve keeper. He did not play in any games during the Apertura 2009 but he got several chances to play in the Clausura 2010 championship following injuries to 1st choice goalkeeper Nicolás Peric. He made his Argentinos Juniors debut in a 0-1 away win against Racing Club on 14 March 2010. He also made an appearance in Argentinos 2 final games of the Clausura 2010 championship, helping the club to secure their first league championship for 25 years. He left Argentinos Juniors in June 2015, after requesting a raise to 300,000 pesos per month.

Titles
Argentinos Juniors 
 Argentine Primera División (1): Clausura 2010

External links
 Statistics at The Guardian
 BDFA profile 
 Argentine Primera statistics at Fútbol XXI  
 
 

1990 births
Living people
People from San Javier Department, Santa Fe
Sportspeople from Santa Fe Province
Argentine footballers
Argentina youth international footballers
Argentine expatriate footballers
Association football goalkeepers
Unión de Santa Fe footballers
Argentinos Juniors footballers
C.D. Veracruz footballers
JEF United Chiba players
Atlético Bucaramanga footballers
Cafetaleros de Chiapas footballers
Club Atlético Mitre footballers
C.D. Jorge Wilstermann players
Club Atlético Platense footballers
Club Sol de América footballers
Argentine Primera División players
Primera Nacional players
Ascenso MX players
Categoría Primera A players
J2 League players
Paraguayan Primera División players
Argentine expatriate sportspeople in Mexico
Expatriate footballers in Mexico
Argentine expatriate sportspeople in Japan
Expatriate footballers in Japan
Argentine expatriate sportspeople in Colombia
Expatriate footballers in Colombia
Argentine expatriate sportspeople in Bolivia
Expatriate footballers in Bolivia
Argentine expatriate sportspeople in Paraguay
Expatriate footballers in Paraguay